The Historic Grand Prix of Monaco (also called the Monaco Historic Grand Prix depending upon the source) is a series of automotive races focussed on historic motorsport. The event is typically held biennially two weeks before the Formula One Grand Prix of Monaco.

History
The first Monaco Historic Grand Prix was held in 1997 as part of the year-long celebrations marking the 700th anniversary of the Grimaldi family's presidency over Monaco. It had only been intended as a one-off event but became a huge success, leading to its continuation as a biennial event from 2000.

With the beginning of the Monaco ePrix Formula E race, the Historic Grand Prix continued to be held in even-numbered years and the ePrix in odd-numbered years. However the 12th edition was postponed due to the COVID-19 pandemic, instead taking place on April 25, 2021, two weeks before the Monaco ePrix and four weeks before the Formula One Grand Prix. Subsequently, the circuit hosted an ePrix in 2022.

The 2010 running of the event was the seventh in the series. It featured eight races total, in various historic motorcar categories:
 Race A - Pre-1947 Voiturettes and Grand Prix cars
 Race B - Front-engined Grand Prix cars (1947–1960)
 Race C - Pre-1953 sports cars
 Race D - Formula 3, 1,000 cc (1964–1970)
 Race E - Rear-engined Grand Prix cars (1954–1965)
 Race F - Formula 1 (1966–1974)
 Race G - Formula 1 (1975–1978)
 Race H - Formula 3, 1,600 cc and 2,000 cc (1971–1984)

By the 9th running of the event in 2014, the number of races had been reduced to 7, and there had been some tweaking of the categories, better to distribute the competition:
A: Pre-war "Voiturettes" and Grand Prix Cars (up to 1939)
B: F1 and F2 Grand Prix Cars (pre-1961)
C: Sports cars (1952–1955)
D: F1 Grand Prix Cars (1961–1965)
E: F1 Grand Prix Cars (1966–1972)
F: F1 Grand Prix Cars (1973–1978)
G: Formula 3 Cars, 2,000cc (1974–1978)

For the 11th running of the event in 2018 the number of races remained, the division into categories based on the year of manufacturing has been adjusted again. The following classes remained static for the 12th running of the event in 2021.
Series A: Pre-war "Voiturettes" and Grand-Prix Cars, up to 1939
Series B: Formula 1 and Formula 2 Grand Prix Cars, manufactured before 1961 
Series C: Sports Cars that ran from 1952 to 1957
Series D: F1 Grand Prix Cars - 1500cc, from 1961 to 1965 
Series E: F1 Grand Prix Cars - from 1966 to 1972 
Series F: F1 Grand Prix Cars - from 1973 to 1976  
Series G: F1 Grand Prix Cars - from 1977 to 1980

Winners

References

External links
Official site
Full race day live stream – coverage of 15 May 2022 on YouTube

Historic motorsport events
Monaco Grand Prix
1997 establishments in Monaco